The 1993 Harvard Crimson football team was an American football team that represented Harvard University during the 1993 NCAA Division I-AA football season. Harvard tied for last in the Ivy League.

In their 23rd and final year under head coach Joe Restic, the Crimson compiled a 3–7 record and were outscored 279 to 233. Brian Ramer was the team captain.

Harvard's 1–6 conference record tied for seventh (and worst) in the Ivy League standings. The Crimson were outscored 193 to 154 by Ivy opponents.

Harvard played its home games at Harvard Stadium in the Allston neighborhood of Boston, Massachusetts.

Schedule

References

Harvard
Harvard Crimson football seasons
Harvard Crimson football
Harvard Crimson football